A standstill is a situation of no movement or activity. See:

Lunar standstill, a time at which the range of the Moon's declination is at a maximum or minimum.
Standstill (band), a Spanish post-hardcore-band.
Standstill (bicycle), a technique used by bicycle riders.
Standstill agreement, an instrument of a hostile takeover defence.
Standstill operation, a surgical procedure that involves cooling the patient's body and stopping blood circulation.
Standstill period